Tsunami Disaster can refer to: 

 2004 Indian Ocean earthquake and tsunami
 2011 Tōhoku earthquake and tsunami